John Mason House may refer to:

 John Mason House (Lexington, Massachusetts), listed on the NRHP in Massachusetts
 John Mason House (Winchester, Massachusetts), listed on the NRHP in Massachusetts
John W. Mason House, in Fergus Falls, Minnesota, listed on the NRHP in Otter Tail County, Minnesota

See also
Mason House (disambiguation)